Bathsheba's spring and bower, also known as Bathsheba's bath and bower, was the name of a well-known eighteenth-century property in Philadelphia's Society Hill neighborhood and said to be the first spa of the area. It had a natural spring well with water that was considered to be of exceptional quality and to have curative properties.

Owner 
Bathsheba Bowers, whose grandparents arrived at Plymouth during the Great Migration from Yorkshire, England, purchased the Second Street property around 1690 from the Free Society of Traders. It was next to a natural spring at Society Hill in Philadelphia, Pennsylvania. There she built a small house of unusual design. Bowers was a recluse and considered an eccentric. Her religion was sometimes that of a Quaker and other times a mix of other religions.

Description 
The property had an elaborately designed garden around the house that Bowers maintained. It was called by many "Bathsheba's bower" and the spring was known as "Bathsheba's spring." The property at Society Hill was also known as "Bathsheba's bath and bower." The spring well water was known as the best quality in the city and said to have curative properties. The bower that was next to the house was surrounded with shrubbery.

According to architect Ieoh Ming Pei, the 1700s property was set up as a business and said to be the first spa in the Society Hill area.  She provided a drinking cup for use by anyone to drink some of the spring water. The property was located near the Benjamin Loxley house on the west side of the street where General Cadwallader constructed a large home. When others tried to construct houses near Cadwallader's they found the ground to be soft from an underground spring. They had to drive piles down into the ground to make a foundation. A local Philadelphian by the name of Alexander Fullerton, when in his mid-seventies around the year 1840, spoke of a property with a spring he remembers as a boy called "Bathsheba's spring and bower" in the Society Hill area. He knew of a village pump near there that drew water from this spring source and that the quality of the water was excellent.

References

Citations

Sources

 

 
Springs of the United States
Spas